Mister Flow may refer to:

 Mister Flow (novel), a French novel by Gaston Leroux
 Mister Flow (film), a 1936 film directed by Robert Siodmak based on the book